Den Selvforsynende Landsby (The Self-sufficient Village) is a Danish ecovillage situated in the town of Hundstrup on the island of Funen. The small community will when completed consist of 26 homes built using environmentally friendly (permacultural) techniques, the residents supplied by a small farm and vegetable garden.

External links
 Official web site

Ecovillages
Villages in Denmark